I sovversivi (internationally released as The Subversives) is a 1967 Italian drama film. It is the first solo film directed by Paolo and Vittorio Taviani, without Valentino Orsini.

It was entered into the 32° Venice Film Festival.

Plot 
The film combines actual footage of Communist leader Palmiro Togliatti's funeral with the intermingled stories of four people affected by his death: Ettore, a Venezuelan radical who abandons the wealthy Italian woman he loves to go back to his country and help his cause; Ludovico, an ailing filmmaker who finds out that art alone is not enough; Giulia, a woman who embarks upon a lesbian affair with a former mistress of her husband; and Ermanno, a philosophy graduate who breaks up with his past.

Cast 
Giulio Brogi: Ettore
Pier Paolo Capponi: Muzio
Lucio Dalla: Ermanno
Fabienne Fabre: Giovanna
Ferruccio De Ceresa: Ludovico
Maria Cumani Quasimodo: Ludovico's mother
José Torres: Rafael
Feodor Chaliapin 
 Vittorio Duse

References

External links

1967 films
Italian drama films
Films directed by Paolo and Vittorio Taviani
Films scored by Giovanni Fusco
1960s Italian-language films
1960s Italian films